.S may refer to:

 .S (source file), a file extension for Assembly language source files, particularly associated with the GNU Assembler
 Dot-S, a lighted toy